Jalna Lok Sabha constituency is one of the 48 Lok Sabha (parliamentary) constituencies in Maharashtra state in Western India.

Assembly Segments
Presently, after the implementation of delimitation of parliamentary constituencies in 2008, Jalna Lok Sabha constituency comprises six Vidhan Sabha (legislative assembly) segments. These segments are:

Members of Parliament

^ by-poll

Election results

General elections 2019

General elections 2014

General Elections 2009

Notes

References

External links
Jalna lok sabha  constituency election 2019 results details

Aurangabad district, Maharashtra
Lok Sabha constituencies in Maharashtra
Politics of Jalna district
1957 establishments in Bombay State
Constituencies established in 1957